Domenico Luca Capozi (9 March 1899 – 30 December 1991) was an Italian Catholic missionary prelate and archbishop of the Roman Catholic Archdiocese of Taiyuan from 1940 to 1983.

Biography
Domenico Luca Capozi was born in Pofi, Frosinone, Kingdom of Italy, on 9 March 1899. He joined the Franciscans in 1915. He was ordained a priest on 8 August 1926. That same year, he came to China to preach. On 12 January 1940, he was appointed vicar apostolic of Taiyuanfu, and became archbishop of the Roman Catholic Archdiocese of Taiyuan on 11 April 1946. He retired in 1983.

Domenico Luca Capozi died on 30 December 1991, at the age of 92.

References

1899 births
1991 deaths
People from Frosinone
Italian Roman Catholic missionaries
Italian Roman Catholic bishops
Chinese Roman Catholic bishops